Batan, officially the Municipality of Batan (Aklanon: Banwa it Batan; Hiligaynon: Banwa sang Batan), is a 4th class municipality in the province of Aklan, Philippines. According to the 2020 census, it has a population of 33,484 people.

History

Pre-Hispanic Period
Batan was believed to be the seat of the government of Datu Bendahara Kalantiaw III, the promulgator of the Code of Kalantiaw in 1433. The code is a collection of 17 laws said to have been used during the time of the Datu before the coming of the Spaniards. The Code of Kalantiaw was later proven to be a fraud.

Spanish Colonial Era
Batan is one of the oldest towns founded in Aklan. Batan was formerly an encomienda of Miguel Rodriguez in 1591. The parish in Batan was established by the Augustinians in 1601 under the patronage of Our Lady of Immaculate Conception. Batan was first incorporated into Aclan or Aklan (now Kalibo) in 1603 and in 1789 it became an independent municipality. In 1903, Batan was again incorporated to the new town of New Washington and became independent again in 1931.

Independent Philippines
In 1957, the Kalantiaw National Shrine marker was erected by the Philippine Historical and Cultural Society to honor the significance of Datu Kalantiaw where it displays a copy of the “original manuscript” of the Code. It was built on a former school building near the municipal seaport which houses the town's historical mementos and antiques, including the original manuscript of the code which the Spaniards obtained from an old chief and translated. In 2004 however, after years of investigation and historical findings, the National Historical Institute concluded that the Code of Kalantiaw was fake and a hoax. Remnants of the Kalantiaw National Shrine marker still remain in Batan, Aklan and the site area was renovated as a park for tourists and locals.

Geography

According to the Philippine Statistics Authority, the municipality has a land area of  constituting  of the  total area of Aklan.

Climate

Barangays
Batan is politically subdivided into 20 barangays.

Demographics

In the 2020 census, Batan had a population of 33,484.

Economy

Government

As of the May 2022 Philippine National and Local Elections, with 23,831 registered voters, Batan's local government unit is led by:

•	Mayor - Mike Ramos (NUP)

•	Vice Mayor - Bodjyk Demeterio (LAKAS)

The members of the Sangguniang Bayan (Councilors) of the Lone District Batan are:

1.	William Bautista Jr. (LAKAS)

2.	Dr. Rina Ghaga Sarceno (NUP)

3.	Nilo Bong Penalba (NUP)

4.	Kap Nonong Jacinto (NUP)

5.	Joy Ramos (LAKAS)

6.	Adam Mamay (NUP)

7.	Liezl Panado (LAKAS)

8.	Davdav Sucgang (PDPLBN)

Tourism
 Tinago Lake or locally known as Tinagong Dagat, is located between the town (near Brgys. Magpag-ong, Ipil and Tabon) and Altavas. Fringed with mangroves and thick undergrowth, it has a rocky beach and it is one of the town's rich fishing grounds. It is also ideal for speed boating and water skiing. It is also one of the sources of fresh oysters in Batan.
At the foot of the hill is a beach ideal for underwater cave diving, scuba diving, fishing, and water sports. It is also one of the rich fishing grounds in Batan.
 Kalantiaw Shrine Marker is a historical marker named after Datu Bendahara Kalantiaw III, the third chief of Panay, who is said to have instituted the Code of Kalantiaw in Batan in 1433. 
 Mambuquiao Marine Protected Area and Fish Sanctuary is a coral reef turned into a fish sanctuary.  Locally called pito, it has the highest live coral cover in Salian Bay. It is ideal for boating, swimming, snorkeling, and scuba diving.
 Macawiwili Mountains is located in Barangay Lalab.
 Puting Bato is a protected wildlife area located in Barangay Angas.
 Pandan Hills is a verdant hill in Barangay Bay-ang overlooking the Sibuyan Sea. It is dubbed as Batan, Aklan's version of Batanes' Marlboro Hills.
 Old Spanish relics from the Spanish colonization period such as the Spanish cannon, Spanish distilleries and old Spanish cemeteries with brick facades can still be seen in Batan, Aklan.
 Aroma Beach Resort is located in Barangay Napti. It features a saltwater pool.
 Borabucay Beach Resort is located in Barangay Songcolan. It is the favorite hangout place of Batangnons and Capiznons.
 Waterfront Beach Resort is located in Barangay Songcolan. It is one of the newest resorts in Batan that is just beside the Borabucay resort.
 Mambu Rise Beach Resort is located in Barangay Mambuquiao. It is a lifestyle resort and features live bands during weekends.
 Paradwys Beach Resort is located in Barangay Napti.
 Casa Del Mar is located in Barangay Ambolong.
 RainForest Botanical Garden is located in Barangay Ambolong. It is an event place that features vegetables, herbal plants, fruit-bearing trees, and flowering plants.
 The Church of Our Lady of Immaculate Conception in Poblacion, Batan. It is considered as one of the oldest churches in Aklan. The church celebrated its quadri-centennial (400 years) of parish existence in 2002.
 Punta, Magpag-ong is a refreshing place to go because it features a sweeping view of the sea. Perfect for those who want to relax and enjoy with its floating BALSA and meditate with nature.
 Batan Municipal Seaport is a port located in Poblacion and considered the oldest in the province of Aklan. It is L-type and made up of concrete materials having a total length of 130 meters. It can accommodate inter-island shipping. The port is the shortest route entry and exit from Batan to the capital town of Kalibo via Dumaguit. A ferry boat service is available every 15 minutes, with a travel time of 4–5 minutes.
 San Lorenzo Ruiz de Manila Parish Church is a parish church in Barangay Camaligan dedicated to San Ruiz de Manila, the first Filipino Martyr and Saint, at the time of his beautification and canonization by Pope John Paul II at Vatican City formal religious ceremonies in Manila, Philippines.
 Camanci Falls is a waterfall that attributes to the natural scenery of Brgy. Camanci and features freshness among the wilderness.

Batan still has pristine beaches, abundant marine life, seafood (Batan is known for its crabs, lobsters, and shrimps), coconut products, grain produce, root crops, fruits, and large forests. If you're lucky, you can find or dig local edible clams called 'kagaykay' that can be found along Batan's shorelines especially in Brgy. Songcolan, Brgy. Mandong, Brgy. Napti, and Brgy. Mambuquiao.

Batan is also known for a special puto cake or steamed rice cake in several different flavors such as cheese and buko. It is a filling and ideal snack because it is about 6-8 inches in diameter, big enough to fill the stomachs of a small group. An advanced reservation is needed to taste this local delicacy that is unique to Brgy. Mandong in Batan.

Local Festivals
 Santo Niñohan or Ati-Ati and Malakara Festival (in honor of the Holy Child) is celebrated every third Saturday and Sunday of January. This festival is very similar to the well-known Ati-Atihan of Kalibo, Aklan. Its difference from Kalibo's Ati-Atihan is that participants are required to use native and indigenous materials as the main components of their costumes and props.
 Immaculate Conception, Batan's Municipal and Religious Fiesta, is celebrated every December 8. It is a weeklong celebration composed of various activities like street parades, foodfest, dance competition, basketball tournament, drum & lyre competition, boat race, marathon, a showcase of local products from each barangay, consecrated mass & flower offering at Kalantiaw Shrine, Lakambini ni Kalantiaw beauty pageant, merrymaking and a concert at the local playground or park performed by DJs, dance groups and OPM bands or artists like Rocksteddy, Hale, Siakol, Brownman Revival and Arnel Pineda.
 Juez De Cuchillo is always held every October 19 to commemorate the capture and beheading of 79 innocent Batangnon civilians on October 19, 1943, by the Japanese Imperial Army. A program, re-enactment, and flower offering are held at the site where the victims were beheaded and slaughtered by the Japanese soldiers. A marker was erected by local officials and relatives of the victims for their remembrance.

Education

Elementary

 Batan Elementary School
 Batan Learning Center
 Bay-ang Elementary School
 Nicolas R. Delgado Elementary School
 Cabugao Elementary School
 Caiyang Elementary School
 Camaligan Elementary School
 Camanci Elementary School
 I Learn Child Center – Batan
 Ipil Elementary School
 Lalab Elementary School
 Lupit Elementary School
 Magubahay Elementary School
 Mambuquiao Elementary School
 Mandong Elementary School
 Man-up Elementary School
 Napti Elementary School
 Palay Elementary School
 Songcolan Elementary School
 Tabon Elementary School
 Talangban Elementary School

Secondary

 Angas Integrated School
 Batan Academy (A National School)
 Batan Academy (A National School) – Lalab Extension
 Bay-ang – Magpag-ong National High School
 Camaligan National High School
 Camanci National High School
 Ipil Integrated School
 Kalantiaw Institute (KI)
 Napti Integrated School
 Rizal J. Rodriguez Sr. National High School
 Tabon Integrated School
 Mandong Integrated School

Tertiary
 Batan Integrated College of Technology (formerly BCC or Batan Community College)

References

External links

 [ Philippine Standard Geographic Code]

Municipalities of Aklan